The Pratt House is a historic house in Reading, Massachusetts.  The two-story wood-frame house built in 1809 and is stylistically a transitional Georgian/Federal structure.  The main portion of the house is a single room deep, and there is a two-story shed-roof extension on the rear.   The house belonged to various members of the locally prominent Pratt family, including Joseph Pratt, the first Reading shoe manufacturer to use a stitching machine.

The house was listed on the National Register of Historic Places in 1984.

See also
National Register of Historic Places listings in Reading, Massachusetts
National Register of Historic Places listings in Middlesex County, Massachusetts

References

Houses on the National Register of Historic Places in Reading, Massachusetts
Houses in Reading, Massachusetts
1809 establishments in Massachusetts
Houses completed in 1809
Federal architecture in Massachusetts
Georgian architecture in Massachusetts